Inner angle may refer to:

 internal angle of a polygon
 Fubini–Study metric on a Hilbert space